East Lynne is a 1925 American silent drama film directed by Emmett J. Flynn and starring Alma Rubens, Edmund Lowe, and Lou Tellegen. The film is based on the bestselling 1861 Victorian novel of the same name by Ellen Wood. The scenario was written by Lenore Coffee and the film's director, Emmett J. Flynn.

Distributed by Fox Film Corporation, the film was a hit for the studio grossing $1.1 million.

Plot
As described in a review in a film magazine, Carlyle (Lowe), a wealthy young Englishman buys a debt-ridden estate from Lord Mount-Severn (Mayne) and persuade his daughter, Lady Isabel (Rubens), to marry him though she loves the rascally Sir Francis (Tellegen). Years pass, and this pair are blessed with two little kiddies. A villager, the father of a wayward girl, is murdered and Richard (Fenton), the brother of Carlyle's former sweetheart Barbara (Daw), is accused. Barbara makes an appointment with Carlyle to ask his help. Lady Isabel, misunderstanding, leaves her kiddies and goes with Sir Francis, who ill-treats her and finally casts her off. Returning to England, she gets in a wreck and is reported dead. Carlyle eventually marries Barbara. Lady Isabel learns that her oldest child is ill and, posing as a nurse, goes to him and nurses him to health. Then she becomes ill and dies, happy in the thought she has saved her child's life and that Carlyle, who had recognized her, will keep her secret.

Cast

Preservation
A complete print of East Lynne is located in the Museum of Modern Art collection.

References

External links

1925 films
Fox Film films
American silent feature films
American black-and-white films
Films based on British novels
Films directed by Emmett J. Flynn
Films set in the 19th century
Films set in England
Films set in the Victorian era
1920s historical drama films
American historical drama films
1925 drama films
1920s American films
Silent American drama films
1920s English-language films
Silent historical drama films